George Leber House, located at 132 East Crafton Avenue in Crafton, Pennsylvania, was built in 1938. This Tudor Revival style house was added to the List of Pittsburgh History and Landmarks Foundation Historic Landmarks in 2003.

References

Houses in Allegheny County, Pennsylvania
Houses completed in 1938
Pittsburgh History & Landmarks Foundation Historic Landmarks